Allameh Tabataba'i University (ATU; [ˌælɒːˈme tæbɒːtæbɒːˈʔiː] , Danushgah-e 'lâmh-e Tâbatâbai) is the largest and the leading specialized public university in humanities and social sciences in Iran.
With 15,624 students and 422 full-time faculty members the university is under the supervision of Ministry of Science, Research and Technology is named in honor of Allameh Tabataba'i, a prominent Iranian sage and philosopher.

Since its establishment by integration of 27 independent colleges, faculties and institutes of higher education in 1983, the university has evolved into the country’s most eminent university in humanities and social sciences.

History

ATU faculties, colleges, and schools

ATU has the following faculties, schools, and colleges:
 Faculty of Communication Sciences
 Faculty of Mathematical and Computer Sciences
 Faculty of Economics
 Faculty of Law and Political Sciences
 Faculty of Management and Accounting
 Faculty of Persian Literature and Foreign Languages
 Faculty of Physical Education and Sports Sciences
 Faculty of Psychology and Education
 Faculty of Social Sciences
 Faculty of Theology and Islamic Knowledge
 ECO College of Insurance (ECOI)
 School of Graduate Studies

Notable alumni 

 Hossein Kazempour Ardabili; Iran's oil-official and representative on OPEC's Board of Governors 
 Mohammad Dabir Moghaddam; professor of linguistics; scientific deputy and permanent member of Iran's Academy of Persian Language and Literature 
 Sayed Hassan Akhlaq; researcher and professor of philosophy
 Alireza Heidari; world champion wrestler; vice-president of Wrestling Federation of IRI
 Alireza Dabir; world champion wrestler; a member of City Council of Tehran 
 Mir Jalaleddin Kazazi; emeritus, researcher, and translator
Poopak Niktalab;Author and Literary researcher; specially children's literature
 Kourosh Safavi; professor of Linguistics
 Naser Hejazi; former Iranian football player
 Valiollah Seif; head of the Central Bank of the Islamic Republic of Iran
 Ali Kardor, managing director of the National Iranian Oil Company

References

External links 
 

 
Educational institutions established in 1956
1956 establishments in Iran
Educational institutions established in 1984
1984 establishments in Iran